Christian Camilo Mafla Rebellón (born January 15, 1993), known as Christian Mafla, is a Colombian footballer who plays for Categoría Primera A side Deportivo Cali.

Career

Boyacá Chicó
Christian Mafla made his professional debut for Boyacá Chicó on April 27, 2011, during a 2-0 Copa Colombia loss to Alianza Petrolera.

New England Revolution
On December 21, 2020, the New England Revolution announced the signing of Christian Mafla from Atlético Nacional. On February 2, 2022, it was announced that Mafla and the Revolution had agreed to mutually part ways ahead of the 2022 season.

Career statistics

Club

Honours
New England Revolution
 Supporters' Shield: 2021

References

External links
 
 

1993 births
Living people
Colombian footballers
Colombian expatriate footballers
Olimpo footballers
Atlético Nacional footballers
Boyacá Chicó F.C. footballers
América de Cali footballers
Argentine Primera División players
Categoría Primera A players
Expatriate footballers in Argentina
People from Palmira, Valle del Cauca
Association football defenders
New England Revolution players
New England Revolution II players
Major League Soccer players
USL League One players
Sportspeople from Valle del Cauca Department
21st-century Colombian people